Inmarko OOO is a Russian producer of ice cream and frozen foods based in Novosibirsk. Currently owned by Unilever, it has factories in Novosibirsk, Omsk and Tula and had over 4,500 employees in 2008. It was sold to Unilever in 2008 and ceased to exist as a separate company in 2012.

History

The foundation of the company 
In 1992, six individuals, including entrepreneurs Vadim Lyubimtsev and Pavel Shutov, founded a business to sell ice cream from street stalls in Novosibirsk. The business was successful, due to the lack of competition in the specialized trade for ice cream. Subsequently, selling ice cream became big business.

In 1993, the company "Inmarko" was registered. The history of this name is unknown. In the early 1990s in Russia, it was fashionable to give companies foreign names. There are several versions of the origin of the name, according to one of the founders, the name came to them during a festival. Now the backronym "investment marketing company" is commonly used.

Inmarko company-distributor 
Inmarko began as a producer and a distributor. At first, they sold ice cream through cold storage facilities in Novosibirsk, and later to cooperate with other regional producers. Sales began with 80 stalls, all in Novosibirsk. Distribution was set through personal contact.

In 1993, the company turned its attention to foreign goods, and not the usual cups or briquettes, but to complex ice cream such as ices or with chocolate-nut filling. This was a novelty in Russia, especially as a cheap and nationally available product. In 1994, Inmarko began to import ice cream, waffle cones and popsicles from Poland, Denmark, England, Sweden, Spain, cooperated with Koral, Augusto, ISCO, Menorquina, and Frideriks companies. However, the basic assortment remained, along with premium ice cream from Denmark and downmarket offerings from Poland.

In 1994, the company purchased freezers from Denmark and moved the sale from trays to kiosks. To stand out, the kiosks were made hexagonal, but kiosks of this shape were inconvenient to use and were quickly abandoned.

Opening of own production 
In the mid 1990s, responding to changing customs regime, Inmarko began to produce formerly imported ice cream.

In 1996, the village Elite of the Novosibirsk region constructed the first Inmarko factory with a capacity of 5 thousand tons. The Danish firm Frisco built the factory. The products and packaging were developed by the designated unit. Inmarko did not advertise at the time, believing that the packaging itself was advertising enough with their unusual bright design.

In addition to the wholesale trade and sales through kiosks, the company began to supply products to stores. After about a year, the existing capacity of the factory was not enough. In 1997 Inmarko purchased state blocks of shares of a factory in Omsk at auction. Frisco worked with Inmarko to upgrade the factory.

Inmarko has upgraded the Omsk factory three times, with potential production capacity now at 50,000 tons.

The expansion of the company 
In 1998–1999, after the Russian financial crisis, the Russian market of foreign manufacturers of ice cream was abandoned. Subsequently, their place was taken by the company Inmarko. The range of products significantly expanded the company and promoted its products in the Central regions. Due to the lack of production capacities and the complexity of delivery in European Russia, Inmarko, the company ordered at other Russian facilities, including those of competitors.

In 2002, Inmarko created a network of official distributors in Siberia, the Urals and in the Central Russia. The number of kiosks in Novosibirsk and Omsk reached 330. In the same year the company became a leader in the ice cream market in Russia selling 27,145 tons.

In 2003, Inmarko establishes a management company called "Business Development" with the aim of attracting investment. A blocking stake in the company was acquired by the EBRD Norum Fund for $8 million Det Norske Veritas conducted a certification audit of the company and Inmarko received a certificate of compliance with international standards ISO 9001: 2000.

In 2004 the company began the conquest of the Central regions of Russia. In the first year of operation in the capital was placed about 1,500 freezer chest freezers. Later in 2005 for the development of sales in the Central regions acquired Inmarko OOO "Fink", a former distributor of ice cream "Algida". As a result of this purchase the sales network of Inmarko has increased by 600 outlets. In the Moscow region, the company was faced with difficulties associated with backwardness of the market of Moscow. In the opinion of the managers of the company, now the capital market is developing at that stage, which was passed in Siberia 10 years ago.

Held placing bonded debt of 1 billion rubles. The resulting funds are directed primarily to repay commercial Bank loans and financing of investment programs. In the same year, for the first time in 12 years of existence, Inmarko started to advertise on national television. In 2006 the company attempted to diversify its products and entered the frozen food market with its own brand "Have an idea". Vegetables and berries are sold under this brand was made under contract at the Polish plant Oerlemans Foods Siemiatycze. However, Inmarko has no plans to expand the sale of frozen products, considering that the business is "unstable and unpromising".

In 2007, the company significantly strengthened its position in the market of European Russia, after acquisition of JSC "Tula "company". The Company is planning a major reconstruction of the Tula factory, putting in the project $53 million, with the commissioning of the factory into operation in 2010. The planned capacity of the factory after reconstruction is 45 thousand tons.

In 2008, Unilever officially announced the acquisition of Inmarko. As a result of this agreement, Unilever became the sole owner of Inmarko.

On 4 April 2012, the company ceased to exist as a separate legal entity after reorganization.

Activities 
Inmarko produced ice cream and frozen foods. The product range of Inmarko had about 120 products (2005).

In 2007, the company's revenue was $170 million.

Branches and representative offices 
In 2009, the company manufactured out of Tula and Omsk, with branches in the cities of Novosibirsk, Omsk, Krasnoyarsk, Novokuznetsk, Kemerovo, Barnaul, Yekaterinburg, Kazan, Moscow and Tula.

According to the company Business Analytics, Inmarko controls 11.8% of sales in natural terms in Russia (in the 16 largest cities).

References

External links 
 The company's official website

Food and drink companies of Russia
Defunct companies of Russia
Companies disestablished in 2012
Manufacturing companies based in Novosibirsk